Eccles Street  is a street in Dublin, Ireland.

History
Eccles Street began on 6 March 1769 when Isaac-Ambrose Eccles leased three parcels of land in the area. The street is named after his family, including his grandfather Sir John Eccles, Lord Mayor of Dublin 1710–11 who owned property on the street.

In James Joyce's novel Ulysses (published 1922, set in 1904), the protagonist Leopold Bloom lives at 7 Eccles Street, and the building was treated as a landmark by Joyce fans. No. 7 was demolished in 1967 by the neighbouring Dominican convent as part of an extension development to their school. The door was saved.

The architect Francis Johnston lived at number 64 Eccles Street.

Architecture 
The Mater Hospital purchased the plot of land in 1975, building the Mater Private Hospital on the site which opened in 1986. The site also has a large surface carpark. The new development saw 36 Georgian houses demolished, despite preservation orders and resistance from groups including An Taisce and the Arts Council. The order then began buying up more Georgian properties on the south side of the street. The windows and doors of three listed houses were illegally blocked up and others were left vacant.

The Mater invited an inspection of the three Georgian houses by Dublin Corporation in February 1988, when they were deemed dangerous. As a result, the buildings were ordered to be demolished to first or second-floor windowsill level. The houses were occupied by the group Students Against the Destruction of Dublin, and legal proceedings ultimately led to them vacating to allow the demolition to go ahead. The legal case revealed that the Mater Hospital Pools had funded the purchase of 28 of the houses on the south side of the street. By 1988, 2 properties were derelict, and 13 were partly or wholly vacant, including 3 already condemned. It emerged that they were aware the roofs had failed in the three condemned buildings as early as 1986, and had done no repair work allowing for the ultimate destruction of the buildings.

See also

List of streets and squares in Dublin

References

Streets in Dublin (city)
1769 establishments in Ireland